Battle Flag may refer to:
War flag or battle flag, a flag typically used by sovereign territories and flown by military forces
Confederate Battle Flag, of the Confederate States of America
"Battle Flag", a 1997 song by Pigeonhed off of their second album, "The Full Sentence"
"Battle Flag" (song), a 1998 song by Lo Fidelity Allstars and Pigeonhed on the album "How to Operate with a Blown Mind"
 Battle Flag, a book in The Starbuck Chronicles series by Bernard Cornwell

See also
Battle ensign, a war flag to be used when a ship enters combat